Athletics competitions at the 2019 Pan American Games in Lima, Peru were held between July 27 and August 11, 2019 at the Athletics Stadium in the Villa Deportiva Nacional Videna cluster, with the marathon and walks being held at Kennedy Park.

A total of 48 events were contested, equally divided among men and women. The women's 50 km walk was added for this edition, marking the first time men and women competed in an equal number of events.

Qualification

Up to a total of 740 athletes were qualified to compete. Each nation may enter a maximum of two athletes in each individual event, and one team per relay event. Each event has a maximum number of competitors and a minimum performance standard. Peru as host nation, is granted an automatic athlete slot per event, in the event no one qualifies for that respective event.

Competition schedule
The competition schedule for athletics at the 2019 Pan American Games is announced.

Participating nations
A total of 40 nations entered athletes, with Suriname being the only country that did not register any in the sport, as their only athlete was injured. The number of athletes a nation has entered is in parentheses beside the name of the country.

Medal summary

Medal table

Results

Men

Women

  Silver medalist Andressa de Morais of Brazil was disqualified for doping violations.

See also
Athletics at the 2015 Pan American Games
Athletics at the 2019 European Games
Athletics at the 2019 Parapan American Games
Athletics at the 2020 Summer Olympics

References

External links
Results book

 
Events at the 2019 Pan American Games
2019
Pan American Games